Novosibirsk Instrument-Building Plant is a company based in Novosibirsk, Russia. Since 2014, it has been a part of the Shvabe Holding.

The Novosibirsk Instrument-Building Plant produces optical instruments, automation equipment for industry, miscellaneous equipment and spare parts for agriculture, and consumer products. The production association was formerly part of the Concern "Optoprom".

References

External links
 Official website

Manufacturing companies based in Novosibirsk
Shvabe Holding
Manufacturing companies of the Soviet Union
Ministry of the Defense Industry (Soviet Union)